is a train station on the Hanshin Railway Kobe Kosoku Line in Hyōgo-ku, Kobe, Hyōgo Prefecture, Japan. It was the first underground structure not crossing an active fault that has completely collapsed during an earthquake without liquefaction of the surrounding soil and was well-documented.

Layout
The Daikai Station consists of three main sections: the main section of the station, the subway tunnels section and the station access section. The location of the station is made up of 2 meter thick man made fill, around 5 meter thick Holocene alluvial deposits, and several kilometers of Pleistocene deposits.

History
The station opened on 7 April 1968.

Damage to the station was caused by the Great Hanshin earthquake in 1995 in which the station collapsed.

Station numbering was introduced on 1 April 2014.

Adjacent stations

References

Railway stations in Hyōgo Prefecture
Railway stations in Japan opened in 1968